Acraea camaena, the large smoky acraea, is a butterfly in the family Nymphalidae. It is found in Senegal, Gambia, Guinea-Bissau, Guinea, Sierra Leone, southern Burkina Faso, Liberia, Ivory Coast, Ghana, Benin, Nigeria, Cameroon, Bioko, the Republic of the Congo and Angola (the Cabinda enclave).

Description

A. camaena Drury (53 f). Forewing unicolorous smoke-black with black median spot but otherwise entirely without markings. Hindwing beyond the middle smoke-black with large free basal and discal dots, before the marginal band yellowish; marginal band incised at the veins, deep black with white dots. Sierra Leone to Nigeria and Fernando Po.

Biology
The habitat consists of dry forests, including open coastal forests.

Both sexes are attracted to flowers.

The larvae feed on Premna hispida and Smeathmannia pubescens.

Taxonomy
It is a member of the Acraea terpsicore species group - but see also Pierre & Bernaud, 2014

References

External links

Images representing Acraea camaena at Bold

Butterflies described in 1773
calida
Butterflies of Africa
Taxa named by Dru Drury